Haematochezia is the passage of fresh blood through the anus path, usually in or with stools (contrast with melena). The term is from Greek αἷμα ("blood") and χέζειν ("to defaecate"). Hematochezia is commonly associated with lower gastrointestinal bleeding, but may also occur from a brisk upper gastrointestinal bleed. The difference between hematochezia and rectorrhagia is that, in the latter, rectal bleeding is not associated with defecation; instead, it is associated with expulsion of fresh bright red blood without stools. The phrase bright red blood per rectum is associated with hematochezia and rectorrhagia.

Causes
In adults, most common causes are hemorrhoids and diverticulosis, both of which are relatively benign; however, it can also be caused by colorectal cancer, which is potentially fatal. In a newborn infant, haematochezia may be the result of swallowed maternal blood at the time of delivery, but can also be an initial symptom of necrotizing enterocolitis, a serious condition affecting premature infants. In babies, hematochezia in conjunction with abdominal pain is associated with intussusception. In adolescents and young adults, inflammatory bowel disease, particularly ulcerative colitis, is a serious cause of hematochezia that must be considered and excluded.

Hematochezia can be due to upper gastrointestinal bleeding.  However, as the blood from such a bleed is usually chemically modified by action of acid and enzymes, it presents more commonly as black "tarry" feces known as melena. Haematochezia from an upper gastrointestinal source is an ominous sign, as it suggests a very significant bleed which is more likely to be life-threatening. Eating beetroot can cause harmless red-colored feces (beeturia) because of insufficient metabolism of a red pigment, and is a differential sign that may be mistaken as hematochezia. Consumption of dragon fruit (pitaya) or blackberries may also cause red or black discoloration of the stool and sometimes the urine (pseudohematuria). This too, is a differential sign that is sometimes mistaken for hematochezia.

In infants, the Apt test can be used to distinguish fetal hemoglobin from maternal blood.

Other common causes of blood in the stool include:
 Colorectal cancer
 Crohn's disease
 Ulcerative colitis
 Other types of inflammatory bowel disease, inflammatory bowel syndrome, or ulceration
 Rectal or anal hemorrhoids or anal fissures, particularly if they rupture or are otherwise irritated
 Shigella or shiga toxin producing  E. coli food poisoning
 Necrotizing enterocolitis
 Diverticulosis
 Salmonellosis
 Upper gastrointestinal bleeding
 Peptic ulcer disease
 Esophageal varices
 Gastric cancer
 Angiodysplasia
 Intense exercise, especially a high-impact activity like running in hot weather.
 Radiation proctitis

Diagnosis
A complete blood count as well as an hemoglobin test should be performed when a patient presents symptoms of hematochezia. A colonoscopy may be necessary if there is suspicion of bleed from colon particularly in the elderly to look for the site and many causes of bleed like carcinoma, ulcerative colitis, rectal varices or other lesions and in certain instances upper gastrointestinal endoscopy may be required as well to look for any rapid and massive fresh bleed from upper gastrointestinal tract when there may not be sufficient time for the change of colour of blood to occur.

See also
 Blood in stool

References

External links 

Bleeding
Gastrointestinal tract disorders
Medical signs